B. laeta may refer to:

 Brachodes laeta, a European moth
 Buprestis laeta, a jewel beetle